The San Rafael Falls (Spanish: La Cascada San Rafael) were, until 2 February 2020, the tallest falls in Ecuador. The  falls were located on the Coca River in Cayambe Coca Ecological Reserve until a collapse of the river bed upstream of the falls diverted the river underneath the band of hard rock that had originally formed the lip of the waterfall, connecting to a cave below and creating a new natural bridge, possibly surpassing Xianren Bridge as the longest in the world. The natural bridge subsequently collapsed in February 2021. The falls were a significant tourist attraction with a recorded 30,000 visitors during 2019.

There has been discussion as to whether the riverbed collapse and subsequent disappearance of the falls is connected with the operation of the Coca Codo Sinclair Dam some 20 km upstream. There are concerns too about how the altered hydrology of the river may affect its ecology. Additionally, the river effectively bypassed the resistant rock of the brink of the falls, causing a sudden river rejuvenation, which in turn has resulted in very rapid headward erosion of a steep-sided gorge upstream of the sinkhole, threatening numerous structures upstream, including the Coca Codo Sinclair Dam.

See also
List of waterfalls by flow rate

References

Waterfalls of Ecuador
Geography of Napo Province
Geography of Sucumbíos Province
Tourist attractions in Ecuador
Natural arches
Collapsed arches